Salem Saleh Mussallam Salem Al-Rejaibi (سالم صالح; born 14 May 1991) is an Emirati international footballer who plays for Al-Sharjah as a forward and midfielder. He played United Arab Emirates national football team in numerous competitions.

International goals 
Scores and results list United Arab Emirates' goal tally first.

References 

Living people
1991 births
Emirati footballers
United Arab Emirates international footballers
Association football forwards
Al Wahda FC players
Al-Nasr SC (Dubai) players
Sharjah FC players
UAE Pro League players